William H. Lynch was a state legislator in Mississippi. He represented Adams County, Mississippi in the Mississippi House of Representatives from 1874 to 1877 and from 1882 to 1889. He was a Republican. He pushed for a bill to establish and fund an institute in Natchez, Mississippi for blind African Americans.

See also
 African-American officeholders during and following the Reconstruction era

References

African-American state legislators in Mississippi
Republican Party members of the Mississippi House of Representatives
African-American politicians during the Reconstruction Era
People from Adams County, Mississippi
Year of death missing
Year of birth missing